Franck Pineau (born 27 March 1963) is a French former racing cyclist, who currently works as a directeur sportif for UCI WorldTeam . He rode in the 1989 Vuelta a España, 1989 Tour de France and 1993 Tour de France.

Major results
1986
 1st Stage 1 Grand Prix du Midi Libre
 5th Overall Tour du Limousin
1987
 9th Grand Prix de Mauléon-Moulins
1988
 1st Boucles de l'Aulne
 6th Grand Prix de Cholet-Mauléon-Moulins
 8th Overall Tour du Limousin
1989
 7th Overall Route du Sud
1990
 2nd Overall Tour d'Armorique
1991
 5th Overall Grand Prix du Midi Libre
 6th Overall Circuit Cycliste Sarthe
1992
 2nd Overall 
 3rd Overall Tour d'Armorique
1993
 3rd Bordeaux–Caudéran
 8th Paris–Camembert
 10th Paris–Bourges

References

External links
 

1963 births
Living people
French male cyclists
Sportspeople from Bourges
Cyclists from Centre-Val de Loire